Audea melanoptera is a moth of the family Erebidae. It is found in Somalia.

References

Moths described in 1985
Audea
Moths of Africa